The You Look Good World Tour was the fifth headlining concert tour by American country music trio, Lady A. The tour was in support of their seventh studio album, Heart Break (2017). It began on May 26, 2017, in Bakersfield, California and finished on October 15, 2017, in Johannesburg, South Africa. The North American leg was a part of the 2017 Live Nation Country Megaticket.

Background
After taking a year off from releasing new music and touring; in January 2017, Lady Antebellum announced that would be going on tour in 2017, as well as releasing new music. They plan to play sixty-five shows in six countries including going back to Europe and trekking to South Africa for the first time. South African tour dates were announced on March 1, 2017 and European dates were announced on March 7.

The official hotel sponsor of the tour is Hilton in which they will give their Hilton Honor members "access to original content and once in a lifetime experiences."

Show
Lady Antebellum opens up the show with their hit "Downtown" followed by "Our Kind of Love". Next is a new track off Heart Break, "This City". During this performance up on the screen there is a sign that says "Welcome to" followed by the city they're performing in that night. Halfway through Hillary Scott performs her own hit "Thy Will" accompanied by Dave Haywood on keys. Horns and additional percussion are brought in for "You Look Good". They also perform past hits, new material off Heart Break, and covers such as "You're Still the One", "Something Like That" and "Crazy in Love". The encore is made up of "Bartender" and "Need You Now".

Opening acts
Kelsea Ballerini 
Lindsay Ell
Jason Benoit 
Refentse Morake 
Gabrielle Shonk
Brett Young

Setlist

"Downtown"
"Our Kind of Love"
"This City"
"Dancin' Away with My Heart"
"Heart Break"
"Compass"/"We Owned the Night"
"American Honey"
"I Run to You"
"Good Time to Be Alive" 
"Thy Will" 
"Hello World" 
"You're Still the One" 
"Just a Kiss"
"You Look Good"
"Lookin' for a Good Time"
"Something Like That" 
"Crazy in Love" 
"Love Don't Live Here"
Encore
"Bartender"
"Need You Now"

Tour dates

List of festivals

Critical reception
Jared Allen of Volume Magazine says that "Lady Antebellum blows Charlotte away with brass and brilliance;" "You Look Good" sounds better than live than on recording.

References

2017 concert tours
Lady A concert tours